Niloofar Rahmani (born early 1990s) is the first female fixed-wing Air Force aviator in Afghanistan's history and the first female pilot in the Afghan Air Force since the fall of the Taliban in 2001. Though her family received death threats, she persevered to complete her training and won the U.S. State Department's International Women of Courage Award in 2015.

Early life

Rahmani was born in Afghanistan in 1992 in a Persian-speaking family. She lived with her family in Pakistan before returning to Kabul in 2001. Since she was a child, she had a dream of becoming a pilot and spent nearly a year studying English to be able to attend flight school. She is of Tajik descent.

Flight career 

She enlisted in the Afghan Air Force Officer Training Program in 2010 and in July 2012 graduated as a Second Lieutenant. Throughout the program, Afghan air force doctors attempted to deem her physically unfit to fly; she was the only female candidate in the program. Two female helicopter pilots during the Soviet era, the Nabizada sisters, along with her father, served as inspiration for Rahmani's achievement.

Her first solo flight was in a Cessna 182. Wanting to fly larger aircraft, she went to advanced flight school and was soon flying the C-208 military cargo aircraft. Women are traditionally banned from transporting dead or wounded soldiers; however, Rahmani defied orders when she discovered injured soldiers upon landing in one mission. Flying them to a hospital, she reported her actions to her superiors, who imposed no sanctions.

When her achievements were publicized, Captain Rahmani's family received threats from both family members and the Taliban, which disapproved of her ambition and career choices. The family has had to move several times but Rahmani was resolute and aimed to fly a larger C-130 plane and become a flight instructor to inspire other women.  She began training on C-130s with the US Air Force in 2015 and completed the program in December 2016, following which she applied for asylum in the United States. Rahmani hoped to eventually become a military pilot for the United States Air Force.

Asylum 
Rahmani, who was represented by International Attorney Kimberley Motley, was granted asylum in the United States in April 2018. She lives in Florida with a sister, who is attempting to gain asylum as well. She works as a translator in Persian, Dari and English languages.

In 2021 she published with Open Skies: My Life as Afghanistan's First Female Pilot her autobiography.

See also
Afghan Air Force
Bibi Ayesha
Latifa Nabizada
Khatool Mohammadzai
Women's rights in Afghanistan

References

External links 

official website
 , May 9, 2018, Fox News.
 , December 28, 2016, askanews.
 , December 27, 2016, euronews (en español).
 , April 29, 2015, Agence France-Presse (AFP).
 , May 8, 2015, TOLOnews.
 , March 10, 2015, ABC 10 News.
 Meet Afghanistan's first female fixed-wing pilot (archived). Al Jazeera English, 9 November 2015.
 "We were wrong …and now we're proud of you". The Conversation, BBC 17 July 2015 (audio, 2 mins).
 Death threats force Afghanistan's first female Air Force pilot to quit. As It Happens, CBC radio, 8 August 2015 (audio, 6:47 mins).

Living people
Afghan aviators
Afghan female military personnel
Women aviators
Recipients of the International Women of Courage Award
Interpreters
Persian–English translators
English–Persian translators
Women in 21st-century warfare
21st-century American translators
Afghan emigrants to the United States
Afghan Tajik people
1992 births
People from Logar Province